Il ragazzo del Pony Express is a 1986 Italian comedy film. It marked the directorial debut of Franco Amurri.

Plot summary 
Milan, Italy mid-1980s. After graduating with honors, Agostino (nicknamed "Ago") is seeking employment. After escaping the set of a pornographic film, he is hired by a courier agency and encounters many troubles.

Cast 

Jerry Calà: Agostino
Isabella Ferrari: Claudia
Alessandro Benvenuti: ragioniere
Emanuela Taschini: Rita
Sergio Di Pinto: Orso
Tiberio Murgia: Doorman 
Fiammetta Baralla: Marmitta  
Corrado Olmi: Agostino's father
Nerina Montagnani: Agostino's aunt

See also  
 List of Italian films of 1986

References

External links

1986 films
Italian comedy films
1986 comedy films
Films directed by Franco Amurri
1986 directorial debut films
Films set in Milan
1980s Italian-language films
1980s Italian films